O Sport, You Are Peace! ( transliterated as O sport, ty - mir!) was a 1981 documentary film directed by Yuri Ozerov. It showed the opening and closing ceremonies, and sporting events of the 1980 Summer Olympics held in Moscow.

The director was awarded the State Prize of the USSR in 1982. The film was selected as the Soviet entry for the Best Foreign Language Film at the 54th Academy Awards, but did not reach the finals.

See also
List of submissions to the 54th Academy Awards for Best Foreign Language Film
List of Soviet submissions for the Academy Award for Best Foreign Language Film

References

External links

1981 films
1980 Summer Olympics
Documentary films about the Olympics
Mosfilm films
1980s Russian-language films
Soviet documentary films
Soviet sports films
Films about the 1980 Summer Olympics